The 1933 Spring Hill Badgers football team was an American football team that represented Spring Hill College as a member of the Dixie Conference during the 1933 college football season. In their fifth year under head coach Moon Ducote, the team compiled a 0–7–1 record.

Schedule

References

Spring Hill
Spring Hill Badgers football seasons
Spring Hill Badgers football